Molokai Airport,  also known as Hoolehua Airport is a state-owned, public use airport located six nautical miles (7 mi, 11 km) northwest of Kaunakakai, on the island of Molokai in Maui County, Hawaii, United States. It is the principal airport of the island. The largest plane to ever fly here regularly was a Boeing 737-200 jet, which seats 127 passengers.

It is included in the Federal Aviation Administration (FAA) National Plan of Integrated Airport Systems for 2021–2025, in which it is categorized as a non-hub primary commercial service facility.

Facilities and aircraft

The passenger terminal complex and general aviation facilities are north of the runway intersection; the passenger terminal complex is near the principal runway and the general aviation facilities are near the crosswind runway.  Vehicular access to these two areas is provided by separate access roadways, each connecting with Keonelele Avenue.

For the 12-month period ending January 11, 2019, the airport had 45,219 aircraft operations, an average of 124 per day: 86% air taxi, 11% general aviation and 3% military. In April 2022, there were six aircraft based at this airport, all single-engine.

The sole airline that services Molokai, Mokulele Airlines, operates the Cessna Grand Caravan 208EX aircraft into the airport.

Airlines and destinations

The following airlines offer scheduled passenger service at this airport:

Statistics

Incidents

References

External links
 Hawaii DOT page for Molokai Airport
 Topographic map from USGS The National Map
 
 
 

Airports in Hawaii
Buildings and structures in Maui County, Hawaii
Transportation in Maui County, Hawaii
Molokai
Airports established in 1927
1927 establishments in Hawaii